The 1963–64 Yugoslav Second League season was the 18th season of the Second Federal League, the second level association football competition of SFR Yugoslavia, since its establishment in 1946. The league was contested in two regional groups (West Division and East Division), with 16 clubs each.

West Division

Teams
A total of sixteen teams contested the league, including twelve sides from the 1962–63 season, one club relegated from the 1962–63 Yugoslav First League and three sides promoted from the third tier leagues played in the 1962–63 season. The league was contested in a double round robin format, with each club playing every other club twice, for a total of 30 rounds. Two points were awarded for wins and one point for draws.

Sloboda were relegated from the 1962–63 Yugoslav First League after finishing in the 13th place of the league table. The three clubs promoted to the second level were Bosna, Šparta Beli Manastir and NK Zagreb.

League table

East Division

Teams
A total of sixteen teams contested the league, including twelve sides from the 1962–63 season, one club relegated from the 1962–63 Yugoslav First League and three sides promoted from the third tier leagues played in the 1962–63 season. The league was contested in a double round robin format, with each club playing every other club twice, for a total of 30 rounds. Two points were awarded for wins and one point for draws.

Budućnost were relegated from the 1962–63 Yugoslav First League after finishing in the 14th place of the league table. The three clubs promoted to the second level were Bor, Pobeda and Radnički Sombor.

League table

See also
1963–64 Yugoslav First League
1963–64 Yugoslav Cup

Yugoslav Second League seasons
Yugo
2